The Plymouth Blitz was a series of bombing raids carried out by the Nazi German Luftwaffe on the English city of Plymouth in  the Second World War. The bombings launched on numerous British cities were known as the Blitz.

The royal dockyards at HMNB Devonport were the main target in order to facilitate Nazi German efforts during the Battle of the Atlantic. Portsmouth, some 170 miles away in Hampshire, was also targeted by the Luftwaffe due to the presence of a royal dockyard there. Despite this, civilian casualties were very high and the dockyards continued in operation.

History 
The first bombs fell on the city on Saturday 6 July 1940 at North Prospect, killing three people. In early 1941, five raids reduced much of the city to rubble. Attacks continued as late as May 1944 with two minor air raids in that month. During the 59 bombing attacks, 1,172 civilians were killed and 4,448 injured.

The resident population fell from 220,000 at the outbreak of war to, at one point, only 127,000. In 1941 most of the children were evacuated and on any night that a raid was expected thousands of people were taken by lorry into the countryside, usually to the fringes of Dartmoor.

Damages to local structures 
In March 1941, St Andrew's Parish Church was bombed and badly damaged. Amidst the smoking ruins a headmistress nailed over the door a wooden sign saying simply Resurgam (Latin for I shall rise again), indicating the wartime spirit, a gesture repeated at other devastated European churches. That entrance to St Andrew's is still referred to as the "Resurgam" door and a carved granite plaque is now permanently fixed there.

Charles Church, Plymouth, destroyed by incendiaries on the nights of 20–21 March 1941, has been preserved in its ruined state as a memorial to civilian victims of the Blitz.

The Laboratory of the Marine Biological Association on the Hoe was also severely damaged on the evening of 20 March 1941. The bombardment is described in the obituary of Stanley Wells Kemp who was the director of the Association at the time. The seminal work by Alan Lloyd Hodgkin and Andrew Fielding Huxley on the ionic basis of nerve conduction resumed there in June 1947.

On the evening of 22 April 1941 during an attack on the central area, the communal air-raid shelter at Portland Square took a direct hit which killed 76 people. Almost 70 years later, this was commemorated by the University of Plymouth, which named a new building on the site after the incident, and also commissioned a local artist to create a commemorative piece. Just three people in the shelter survived.

During the Blitz the two main shopping centres and nearly every civic building were destroyed, along with 26 schools, eight cinemas and 41 churches. In total, 3,754 houses were destroyed with a further 18,398 seriously damaged.

Reconstruction 
So great was the devastation of the largely Victorian era streets of central Plymouth, that in the autumn of 1941, the City Council appointed Professor Patrick Abercrombie, an eminent town planner, to prepare a plan for the city's reconstruction. The completed plan, which was co-authored by James Paton Watson, A Plan for Plymouth, was published in March 1944, and proposed a radical redevelopment. Main roads were diverted around the city, while the original street plan of city centre, with the exception of Union Street, was to be erased and replaced with a grand vista leading from Naval Memorial on Plymouth Hoe to Plymouth railway station, intersected by new roads and lined by modern buildings. Plymouth was the only British city to retain its wartime plans; reconstruction of the city centre began in 1948 and was completed in 1962.

Notes

References

Bibliography 

 
 
 
 
 
 
 
 

The Blitz
Blitz
1940s in Devon